The Malaysian team had qualified for at least three AFC Asian Cups in their history, in 1976, 1980 and 2007. However, Malaysia's best record in both tournament is just the group stage, winning only one game throughout three competitions.

Competitive results

Iran 1976

Group A

Kuwait 1980

Group B 

Malaysia's performance at 1980 Asian Cup is still considered today as the finest performance ever of Malaysia, and since then, Malaysia did not qualify for the Asian Cup until 2007.

Indonesia/Malaysia/Thailand/Vietnam 2007

Group C 

Malaysia's performance in 2007 Asian Cup is still remembered as the worst performance ever for a host nation in the Asian Cup. After the tournament, criticisms run high with the defeat of the Malay Tigers, even in the foreign press.

References 

Countries at the AFC Asian Cup